The Dolphin Stakes was an American Thoroughbred horse race run between 1887 and 1909 at Sheepshead Bay Race Track in Sheepshead Bay, Brooklyn, New York. Open to three-year-old horses, it was raced over a distance of 1 1/8 miles on dirt.

Historical notes
The inaugural edition of the Dolphin Stakes was won by Kingston who would finish his racing career with 89 wins, the most in the history of Thoroughbred racing. Kingston, his jockey, and his trainer all would have careers that led to induction in America's Racing Hall of Fame.

In 1894 Henry of Navarre was another future Hall of Fame inductee that won the Dolphin Stakes. He came into the event having already won that year's Travers and Belmont Stakes.

Beldame, a third Dolphin Stakes winner that would be inducted in the Hall of Fame, won the 1904 running. For that year she would be named American Horse of the Year.

The final edition of the Dolphin Stakes was won by Gliding Belle, a filly owned by William F. Schulte who had been an owner of Churchill Downs and served as president and CEO from 1895 to 1901. Schulte was responsible for adding the now iconic twin spires to the Churchill Downs grandstand.

The End of a Race and of a Racetrack
The 1908 passage of the Hart–Agnew anti-betting legislation by the New York Legislature under Republican Governor Charles Evans Hughes created havoc in the state's racing industry and would lead to a complete shutdown of racing in 1911 and 1912. 
The owners of Sheepshead Bay Race Track, and other racing facilities in New York State, struggled to stay in business without income from betting. Racetrack operators had no choice but to eliminate certain races and drastically reduce the purse money being paid out which resulted in the Dolphin Stakes not being run in 1908. Brought back in 1909 with a purse reduced to less than one-eighth of what it had been in earlier years. These small purses made horse racing unprofitable and impossible for even the most successful horse owners to continue in business. A February 21, 1913 ruling by the New York Supreme Court, Appellate Division saw horse racing return in 1913. However, it was too late for the Sheepshead Bay horse racing facility and it never reopened.

Records
Speed record:
 1:53 flat @ 1 1/8 miles: Nealon (1906)

Most wins by a jockey:
 2 – Jim McLaughlin  (1998, 1888)
 2 – Fred Taral (1891, 1893)
 2 – Frank O'Neill (1904, 1905)

Most wins by a trainer:
 2 – William Lakeland (1893, 1895, 1896)

Most wins by an owner:
 2 – Byron McClelland (1892, 1894)
 2 – James R. Keene (1893, 1895)

Winners

References

Discontinued horse races in New York City
Flat horse races for three-year-olds
Open mile category horse races
Sheepshead Bay Race Track
Recurring sporting events established in 1887
Recurring sporting events disestablished in 1909
1887 establishments in New York (state)
1909 disestablishments in New York (state)